Smoke is a large-scale sculpture conceived by American artist Tony Smith in 1967 that was fabricated posthumously in 2005 for the Los Angeles County Museum of Art (LACMA) where it was installed in 2008.  This two-tier sculptures standing 24 foot tall is made of aluminum and painted black.

Location history

Smoke is unique in that it is Smith’s only large-scale work specifically intended for an interior space.  The first iteration of the sculpture was a painted plywood version installed in the atrium of the Corcoran Gallery in Washington D.C. in 1967. This version, measuring 45 feet long, 33 feet wide, and 22 feet high, was based on Smith's small-scale cardboard model, and was built and painted by three to seven workmen over the course of two months, at a cost of $6,000. LACMA’s painted aluminum version was installed in 2008 and the first in an edition of three; second in the edition is in a private collection. 

Art historian Joan Pachner described the artwork as one that does not have a single focal point or axis: "it looks like a complicated jungle gym. Interior views are dominated by the linear scaffold and the implied infinite expanse of the design." 

The sculpture has been on permanent view in the Ahmanson Building Room at LACMA since 2008.

Acquisition

Smoke was acquired by LACMA in 2010 (as accession number M.2010.49) through a gift from the Belldegrun Family in honor of Rebecka Belldegrun's birthday

See also
 List of Tony Smith outdoor sculptures
 Smog (1/3)

References

External links
 Time Lapse Video of the 2008 Installation of Smoke

1967 sculptures
2005 sculptures
Aluminum sculptures in the United States
Collection of the Los Angeles County Museum of Art
Public art in the United States
Sculptures by Tony Smith